Global Telecoms Exploitation is reportedly a secret British telephonic mass surveillance programme run by the British signals intelligence and computer security agency, the Government Communications Headquarters (GCHQ). Its existence was revealed along with its sister programme, Mastering the Internet, in June 2013 as part of the global surveillance disclosures by the former National Security Agency contractor Edward Snowden.

See also
 Mass surveillance in the United Kingdom
 Mastering the Internet
 Tempora

References

Civil rights and liberties in the United Kingdom
Mass intelligence-gathering systems
Programmes of the Government of the United Kingdom
Computer network security
GCHQ operations